North, Central American and Caribbean U-23 records in the sport of athletics are the all-time best marks set in competition by an athlete who competes for a member nation of the North American, Central American and Caribbean Athletics Association (NACAC) by aged 22 or younger throughout the entire calendar year of the performance. Technically, in all under-23 age divisions, the age is calculated "on December 31 of the year of competition" to avoid age group switching during a competitive season. NACAC doesn't maintain an official list for such performances. All bests shown on this list are tracked by statisticians not officially sanctioned by the governing body.

Outdoor

Key to tables:

A = affected by altitude

Men

Women

Indoor

Men

Women

Notes

References

NACAC
NACAC